Sadatmasaura also known as Sadatmasaura Census Town is a Census Town situated in Jaunpur district of Uttar Pradesh, India.

Demographics
The total population of Sadatmasaura town consists of 4,800 people amongst them 2,452 are males and 2,348 are females.

References

Census towns in Uttar Pradesh
Census towns in Jaunpur district